Lotfi Ben Slimane (born 21 March 1964) is a Tunisian volleyball player. He competed in the men's tournament at the 1988 Summer Olympics.

References

1964 births
Living people
Tunisian men's volleyball players
Olympic volleyball players of Tunisia
Volleyball players at the 1988 Summer Olympics
Place of birth missing (living people)